Reginald Slack (born May 2, 1968) is an American former Canadian and American football quarterback.

After spending his collegiate career with Auburn, Slack was selected in the 12th round (321st overall) in the 1990 NFL Draft by the Houston Oilers. Slack also played in the WLAF for the New York/New Jersey Knights and then played in the Canadian Football League with the Winnipeg Blue Bombers and the Saskatchewan Roughriders, whom he led to a Grey Cup appearance in 1997.

Since retiring from football, in 2014 Reggie opened a pizza restaurant in Navarre, Florida.

References 

1968 births
Living people
African-American players of American football
African-American players of Canadian football
American football quarterbacks
American players of Canadian football
Auburn Tigers football players
Birmingham Barracudas players
Canadian football quarterbacks
Hamilton Tiger-Cats players
Houston Oilers players
New York/New Jersey Knights players
Players of American football from Florida
Saskatchewan Roughriders players
Toronto Argonauts players
Winnipeg Blue Bombers players
People from Milton, Florida
21st-century African-American people
20th-century African-American sportspeople